Juan Carlos Portillo (born 18 May 2000) is an Argentine professional footballer who plays as a centre-back or defensive midfielder for Unión Santa Fe.

Career
Portillo joined Crucero del Norte in 2015. He made his first-team breakthrough during the 2018–19 Torneo Federal A, making his debut off the bench on 2 December 2018 in a victory away to Altos Hornos Zapla. Portillo scored his first goal in his next appearance, netting in a Copa Argentina qualifying round first leg draw with San Martín de Formosa on 16 January 2019. Eight further appearances came up until March. Midway through the year, Portillo was loaned with three teammates to Paraguay with Primera División B Nacional side Deportivo Itapuense; an affiliate of Crucero's.

After appearing seven times back with Crucero in 2019–20, Portillo left permanently to join Primera División outfit Unión Santa Fe in July 2020. He scored in an October friendly match versus Newell's Old Boys. His first competitive appearance arrived on 28 November against Racing Club in the Copa de la Liga Profesional; replacing Kevin Zenon with seventeen minutes remaining.

Career statistics
.

Notes

References

External links

2000 births
Living people
Sportspeople from Misiones Province
Argentine footballers
Association football defenders
Association football midfielders
Argentine expatriate footballers
Expatriate footballers in Paraguay
Argentine expatriate sportspeople in Paraguay
Torneo Federal A players
Paraguayan Tercera División players
Argentine Primera División players
Crucero del Norte footballers
Unión de Santa Fe footballers